Diamond Hill is a hill and its surrounding residential district in Kowloon, Hong Kong.

Diamond Hill may also refer to:

Diamond Hill station in Diamond Hill, Kowloon, Hong Kong
Diamond Hill (Antarctica), a large hill
Diamond Hill (Cumberland, Rhode Island), a large hill
Diamond Hill Historic District, Lynchburg, Virginia, United States
Diamond Hill-Jarvis High School, Fort Worth, Texas, United States
Diamond Hill in Transvaal, South Africa, where the British and the Boers fought the Battle of Diamond Hill
Diamond Hill (Ireland) in Letterfrack, Ireland, part of the Connemara National Park

See also
Diamond Mountain (disambiguation)
Diamond Peak (disambiguation)
Diamond Head, Hawaii